The 1946 Oklahoma gubernatorial election was held on November 5, 1946, and was a race for Governor of Oklahoma. Democrat  Roy J. Turner defeated Republican Olney F. Flynn and three Independents, Mickey Harrell, R. M. Funk, and Bruno Miller.  Dixie Gilmer unsuccessfully sought the Democratic nomination.

Results

References

1946
Gubernatorial
Okla